Company of Heroes is a real-time strategy video game series developed by Relic Entertainment. The series is set during World War II.

Games

Company of Heroes 

The first game in the series was released on September 12, 2006 in North America, and September 29, 2006 in Europe. It was ported to iOS and released for iPad on February 13, 2020.

Company of Heroes: Opposing Fronts

The first stand-alone expansion pack to Company of Heroes, it was released September 25, 2007 in the US and September 28 in Europe.

Company of Heroes: Tales of Valor

The second stand-alone expansion pack to Company of Heroes, it was released on April 9, 2009.

Company of Heroes Online 

Company of Heroes Online was a free massively multiplayer online real-time strategy game developed by Relic Entertainment and published by THQ. The open beta for the game started on 2 September 2010, and the game was cancelled on March 31st 2011. The game has no link with the original Company of Heroes multiplayer system and is a stand-alone game, unlike its predecessors. The game uses the same graphics engine as the retail release of Company of Heroes. Relic also released a Chinese and a South Korean version of the game. The Chinese version was co-developed and published by Shanda while the South Korean version was published by WindySoft and developed entirely by Relic Entertainment. The Korean and American versions featured the entire single-player campaign from the retail release while the Chinese version did not.

Company of Heroes Online was a real-time strategy game which was based on Company of Heroes. Its gameplay placed emphasis on usage of varying degrees of cover together with a destructible terrain. Another departure from mainstream RTS's was the implementation of sector supply whereby the resource income of a player is linked to the sectors under that player's control. A unique feature of Company of Heroes Online was the large number of combinations of hero units, special abilities and doctrinal abilities a player could utilize, giving the potential for diverse and creative strategies.

Company of Heroes 2 

A sequel, Company of Heroes 2, was released on June 25, 2013 in North America and Europe. The game features the USSR's Red Army as a new faction and takes the player on various stages of the Eastern Front campaign, from Operation Barbarossa to the Battle of Berlin. It uses the Essence 3.0 engine which includes environmental effects and the "True Sight" and "ColdTech" systems mimicking unit line of sight and weather effects such as snow and mud as well as blizzards.

Company of Heroes 3 

Company of Heroes 3 was announced by Relic and Sega in July 2021. The game takes place once again in WW2, this time, in Italy and some parts of the North African Campaign. It was released on February 23, 2023.

References 

 
Video game franchises introduced in 2006
Relic Entertainment games